The coat of arms of Bavaria has greater and lesser versions.

It was introduced by law fully by 5 June 1950:

Meaning
The modern coat of arms was designed by Eduard Ege, following heraldic traditions, in 1946.
 First Quarter (The Golden Lion): At the dexter chief, sable, a lion rampant Or, armed and langued gules. This represents the administrative region of Upper Palatinate. It is identical to the coat of arms of the Electorate of the Palatinate.
 Second Quarter (The Franconian Rake): At the sinister chief, per fess dancetty, gules and argent. This represents the administrative regions of Upper, Middle and Lower Franconia. This was the coat of arms of the prince bishops of Würzburg, who were also dukes of Franconia.
 Third Quarter (The Blue Panther): At the dexter base, argent, a panther rampant azure, armed Or. This represents the regions of Lower and Upper Bavaria.
 Fourth Quarter (The Three Lions): At the sinister base, Or, three lions passant guardant sable, armed gules. This represents Swabia.
 The White and Blue Inescutcheon (Herzschild = "Heart Shield"): The escutcheon of white and blue oblique fusils was originally the coat of arms of the counts of Bogen, adopted in 1242 by the House of Wittelsbach. The white and blue fusils are indisputably the emblem of Bavaria and the heart shield today symbolizes Bavaria as a whole. Along with the People's Crown, it forms part of the official minor or lesser coat of arms.
 The People's Crown: The four coat fields with the heart shield in the centre are crowned with a golden band with precious stones decorated with five ornamental leaves. This crown appeared in the coat of arms for the first time in 1923 to symbolize the sovereignty of the people after the dropping out of the royal crown.

History

Bavaria was one of the stem duchies of the Eastern Franconian Empire and the Holy Roman Empire.  The House of Wittelsbach, which ruled in Bavaria for about eight centuries, used the coat lozengy from 1242, later quartering it with the lion of the Electorate of the Palatinate.

Bavaria became a kingdom in 1806, and in 1835 a new coat of arms was created, similar to today's but representing some regions by different coats of arms.
The first known coat of arms of the House of Wittelsbach was azure, a golden fess dancetty.  When Louis I married Ludmilla, the widow of Albert III, Count of Bogen, he adopted the coat of arms of the counts of Bogen together with their land.  The number of lozenges varied; from the 15th century 21 were used, increasing to 42 when Bavaria became a kingdom in 1806.

Lit: Wilhelm Volkert; Die Bilder in den Wappen der Wittelsbacher (Wittelsbach und Bayern, Köln, 1980)

Coat of arms of Kraiburg

In the eleventh century the counts of Kraiburg, a branch of the counts of Sponheim originating in what is today Rhenish Hesse, acquired land in Upper and Lower Bavaria. In 1259, after the death of the last male member of the family, the county was sold to the dukes of Bavaria. The coat of arms of the family was the "Lion of Sponheim", although the charge was not a lion but a "panthier" (pronounced as in French), a mixture of a dragon and a lion. Nowadays, the fire-spitting panthier/panther is the coat of arms of the city of Ingolstadt. The coat of arms created for the Kingdom of Bavaria in 1835 included the panthier.

See also
Coat of arms of Prussia
Coat of arms of Germany
Origin of the coats of arms of German federal states

References

Bavaria
Culture of Bavaria
Bavaria
Bavaria